Chila Pillune (possibly from Aymara pillu crown or cord which some indigenous peoples use to tighten their hair, -ni a suffix to indicate ownership, pilluni "the one with a crown" or "the one with a pillu") is a mountain in the western part of the Chila mountain range in the Andes of Peru, about  high. It lies in the Arequipa Region, Castilla Province, Chachas District. Chila Pillune is situated west of Chila, the highest mountain of the range, northeast of Ticlla and south of Apacheta.

References 

Mountains of Peru
Mountains of Arequipa Region